The Linguistics Association of Great Britain (LAGB) is an association which claims to be the leading professional association for academic linguists there.

The association's predecessor was the Germanist Jeffrey Ellis' Linguistic Circle at Hull University which became active in the late 1950s.  It was renamed LAGB and had its first meeting of significance on 1 November 1959.

The association has published the Journal of Linguistics since 1964.

Notable people
 David Adger, Professor of Linguistics at Queen Mary University of London, became its 17th president in 2015
Kersti Börjars, Professor at University of Manchester and the University of Oslo, was president from 2005 until 2011
 Eugénie Henderson, Chair from 1977 to 1980

References

Professional associations based in the United Kingdom
Linguistics organizations